Burringbar is a village south-east of Murwillumbah in the Northern Rivers region of New South Wales, Australia.

Demographics

The median age of the Burringbar population was 41 years, 4 years above the national median of 37.

81.2% of people living in Burringbar were born in Australia. The other top responses for country of birth were England 4.1%, New Zealand 1.5%, Scotland 0.9%, Germany 0.9%, Canada 0.7%.

90.4% of people spoke only English at home; the next most common languages were 1.4% Italian, 0.5% Lithuanian, 0.5% Spanish, 0.3% German, 0.3% Maltese.

The novelist Jessica Cole, otherwise known as Jessie Cole, comes from Burringbar, and Burringbar is also the locale for much of her writing.

References

Suburbs of Tweed Heads, New South Wales